Btooom! is an anime series adapted from the manga of the same title by Jun'ya Inoue. The story takes place after the release of a Massively multiplayer online game called Btooom! In the game players are required to utilize stealth and strategy to eliminate each other using the only weapons available to them—a sonar ability to detect nearby players and bombs. One day Ryota Sakamoto awakens to find himself stranded on a tropical island with a pouch full of bombs and a computer chip embedded in his hand. He soon learns that he has been entered into a competition where he must play Btooom! for real—where losing means death.

Produced by Madhouse and directed by Kotono Watanabe, the series was broadcast on Tokyo MX from October 4 to December 20, 2012 and was later aired on Sun TV, KBS, TV Aichi, BS11 and AT-X along with online streaming on Niconico. The series was picked up by Crunchyroll for online simulcast streaming in North America and other select parts of the world. The Anime Network later acquired the series for streaming on their online service. FlyingDog released the series in Japan on six Blu-ray and DVD volumes starting on November 21, 2012. The anime was licensed by Sentai Filmworks for distribution in North America. Hanabee Entertainment later licensed the series for release in Australia. MVM Entertainment also acquired the series for distribution in the United Kingdom.

The opening theme song is "No Pain, No Game" by nano while the ending theme is "Aozora" (アオゾラ) by May'n. The twelfth episode uses  by nano as the opening theme while "No Pain, No Game" is used as the ending theme.


Episode list

Home media
FlyingDog released the series in Japan on six Blu-ray and DVD volumes between November 21, 2012 and April 24, 2013. The complete series was released on Blu-ray and DVD volumes by Sentai Filmworks on December 10, 2013 and Hanabee Entertainment on February 8, 2014. MVM Entertainment released the series on March 17, 2014 on DVD format only. These releases contained English and Japanese audio options and English subtitles.

Notes

References

External links 
Official anime website 

Btooom!